The Tower of Calanca  is a Genoese tower located in the commune of Olmeto on the west coast of Corsica.

The tower was built in the second half of the 16th century. It was one of a series of coastal defences constructed by the Republic of Genoa between 1530 and 1620 to stem the attacks by Barbary pirates.

See also
List of Genoese towers in Corsica

References

Towers in Corsica
Buildings and structures in Corse-du-Sud
Tourist attractions in Corse-du-Sud